Frances Glessner Lee (March 25, 1878 – January 27, 1962) was an American forensic scientist. She was influential in developing the science of forensics in the United States. To this end, she created the Nutshell Studies of Unexplained Death, 20 true crime scene dioramas recreated in minute detail at dollhouse scale, used for training homicide investigators. Eighteen of the Nutshell Studies of Unexplained Death are still in use for teaching purposes by the Maryland Office of the Chief Medical Examiner, and the dioramas are also now considered works of art. Glessner Lee also helped to establish the Department of Legal Medicine at Harvard, and endowed the Magrath Library of Legal Medicine there. She became the first female police captain in the United States, and is known as the "mother of forensic science".

Early life
Glessner Lee was born in Chicago on March 25, 1878. Her father, John Jacob Glessner, was an industrialist who became wealthy from International Harvester. She and her brother were educated at home; her brother went to Harvard.  

As a child Frances fell ill with tonsillitis, and her mother took her to the doctor. When the first option prescribed a dangerous treatment for her illness, the Glessner's sought a second opinion and Frances was able to have a successful surgery at a time when surgery was still risky. 

Frances became interested in learning more about medicine because of this experience. When summering in the White Mountains, local doctors allowed her to attend home visits with them. There Glessner learned the skills of nursing.  

She inherited the Harvester fortune and finally had the money to pursue an interest in how detectives could examine clues.

Career
Glessner Lee was inspired to pursue forensic investigation by one of her brother's classmates, George Burgess Magrath, with whom she was close friends. He was studying medicine at Harvard Medical School and was particularly interested in death investigation.  Magrath would become a professor in pathology at Harvard Medical School and a chief medical examiner in Boston and together they lobbied to have coroners replaced by medical professionals. 

In 1931, Glessner Lee endowed the Harvard Department of Legal Medicine—the first such department in the country—and her gifts would later establish the George Burgess Magrath Library, a chair in legal medicine, and the Harvard Seminars in Homicide Investigation. 

She also endowed the Harvard Associates in Police Science, a national organization for the furtherance of forensic science; it has a division dedicated to her, called the Frances Glessner Lee Homicide School.

Nutshell Studies of Unexplained Death 

In 1945 Glessner Lee donated her dioramas to Harvard for use in her seminars. She hosted a series of semi-annual seminars, where she presented 30 to 40 men with the "Nutshell Studies of Unexplained Death", intricately constructed dioramas of actual crime scenes, complete with working doors, windows and lights. The 20 models were based on composites of actual cases and were designed to test the abilities of students to collect all relevant evidence. The models depicted multiple causes of death, and were based on autopsies and crime scenes that Glessner Lee visited.

She paid extraordinary attention to detail in creating the models. The rooms were filled with working mousetraps and rocking chairs, food in the kitchens, and more, and the corpses accurately represented discoloration or bloating that would be present at the crime scene. Each model cost about $3,000-$4,500 to create. Viewers were given 90 minutes to study the scene. Eighteen of the original dioramas were still used for training purposes by Harvard Associates in Police Science in 1999.

For her work, Glessner Lee was made an honorary captain in the New Hampshire State Police on October 27, 1943, making her the first woman to join the International Association of Chiefs of Police.

The dioramas of the crime scenes Glessner depicted were as follows; three room dwelling, log cabin, blue bedroom, dark bathroom, burned cabin, unpapered bedroom, pink bathroom, attic, woodsman's shack, barn, saloon and jail, striped bedroom, living room, two story porch, kitchen, garage, parsonage parlor, and bedroom. The models can now be found at the Maryland Office of the Chief Medical Examiner in relation to Harvard Medical School. They were once part of a exhibit in the Renwick Gallery of the Smithsonian American Art Museum.

Personal life
Glessner married a lawyer, Blewett Harrison Lee, who was from the family line of General Robert E Lee, with whom she had three children. The marriage ended in divorce in 1914. 

Glessner Lee's perfectionism and dioramas reflect her family background. Her father was an avid collector of fine furniture with which he furnished the family home. He wrote a book on the subject, and the family home, designed by Henry Hobson Richardson, is now the John J. Glessner House museum. 

The first miniature Glessner built was of the Chicago Symphony Orchestra. She did so for her mother's birthday and it was her biggest project at the time. Glessner Lee was fond of the stories of Sherlock Holmes, whose plot twists were often the result of overlooked details. Many of her dioramas featured female victims in domestic settings, illustrating the dark side of the "feminine roles she had rehearsed in her married life."

In popular culture
 The first book about Frances Glessner Lee and her dioramas, "The Nutshell Studies of Unexplained Death" by Corinne Botz, is published by Monacelli Press in 2004. 
 Frances Glessner Lee's biography, 18 Tiny Deaths: The Untold Story of Frances Glessner Lee and the Invention of Modern Forensics, by Bruce Goldfarb, was released by Sourcebooks on February 4, 2020.
The Nutshell Studies of Unexplained Death provided the inspiration for the Miniature Killer in the television show CSI: Crime Scene Investigation.
 Glessner Lee is paid tribute to in the book Encyclopedia Horrifica by Joshua Gee.
 Frances Glessner Lee and Erle Stanley Gardner were friends, and he dedicated several of his detective novels to her, including The Case of the Dubious Bridegroom.
 The character of Agnes Lesser in the Father Brown episode "The Smallest of Things" is based on Glessner Lee.
 The Renwick Gallery of the Smithsonian American Art Museum exhibited 18 of the Nutshell Studies of Unexplained Death from October 20, 2017 to January 28, 2018. Sponsors included the American Academy of Forensic Sciences.
 On November 18, 2017, the film Murder in a Nutshell: The Frances Glessner Lee Story, directed by Susan Marks, premiered at the Renwick Gallery, followed by a moderated discussion with filmmaker.
 Frances Glessner Lee and her pioneering work with crime scene dioramas is cited in some detail and plays a crucial role in episode 17 of the 17th season of NCIS, "In a Nutshell".

See also
 New Hampshire Historical Marker No. 257: Frances Glessner Lee (1878–1962) 'Mother of Forensic Science'

References

Further reading
Botz, Corinne May. The Nutshell Studies of Unexplained Death. New York: Monacelli, 2004. , 
Goldfarb, Bruce. 18 Tiny Deaths: The Untold Story of Frances Glessner Lee and the Invention of Modern Forensics Naperville, IL. Sourcebooks 2020
 , October 23, 2017.
 Jeltsen, Melissa. "These Bloody Dollhouse Scenes Reveal A Secret Truth About American Crime." Huffington Post, February 2, 2018.
 Rosberg, Gerald M. "A Colloquium on Violent Death Brings 30 Detectives to Harvard". The Harvard Crimson, December 6, 1966.
 “Murder Is Her Hobby: Frances Glessner Lee and The Nutshell Studies of Unexplained Death | Smithsonian American Art Museum.” https://americanart.si.edu/exhibitions/nutshells.

External links
 The Nutshell Studies of Unexplained Death Photographs
Of Dolls and Murder documentary website
Glessner House website

1878 births
1962 deaths
American forensic scientists
Women forensic scientists
American women philanthropists
Philanthropists from Illinois
People from Chicago
Women in law enforcement
Model makers
Harvard Medical School people